The Crest dil Cut (also known as Cresta dil Cot) is a mountain of the Swiss Lepontine Alps, situated west of Rothenbrunnen in the canton of Graubünden. It lies near the northern end of the range separating the Safiental from the Domleschg valley.

References

External links

 Crest dil Cut on Hikr

Mountains of the Alps
Mountains of Switzerland
Mountains of Graubünden
Lepontine Alps
Two-thousanders of Switzerland
Cazis